Erica McCall (born August 21, 1995) is an American professional basketball player who is currently a free agent. She played college basketball at Stanford University and completed her high school education at Ridgeview High School in Bakersfield, California.

Early life
Erica was born on August 21, 1995 to Gregory and Sonya McCall. She has two siblings, brother Justin McCall, and sister DeWanna Bonner, who plays basketball for the Connecticut Sun in the WNBA.

USA Basketball
McCall was named to the USA Basketball U16 team, which competed in the Second FIBA Americas U16 Championship in 2011, held in Merida, Mexico. The team won all five contests, with an average margin of victory of 43 points per game. The win secured the gold medal for the competition, as well as an automatic bid to the Second FIBA U17 World Championship For Women - 2012 held in Amsterdam. McCall played in four of the five games, averaging three points per game.

McCall continued with the team as the U16 team became the U17 team and competed in the world championship event held in Amsterdam. The USA team won all eight contests to win the world championship and the gold-medal for the event. McCall played in  all eight contests and averaged 3.8 points per game.

McCall was named to the 3x3 U18 team for the USA, along with teammates Kaela Davis, Diamond DeShields, and Brianna Turner. The event, formally known as the 3x3 Youth World Championship, was renamed to be the FIBA 3x3 U18 World Championship For Women. The 2012 championship was held in Alcobendas, Spain. The team started by winning their first four contest easily. In the fifth game they were matched against China. Both Davis and DeShields fouled out in regulation, leaving McCall and Turner to take on the three players for China. Despite the imbalance they took the game to overtime. In the overtime. The contest continued with two players against three, but McCall and Turner were unable to outscore their opponents in China won the game 13-12. The team went on to win the remaining games including the metal rounds to end up with a 7-1 record and the gold-medal representing the championship.

McCall has been named to the USA team scheduled to play at the World University games scheduled to be held July 4–13 in Gwangju, South Korea. She played a key role in the success of the team, averaging 15 points per game and leading all players at the tournament and field-goal percentage, hitting 59.7% of her field-goal attempts. She had a double double in the opening game against Italy with 22 points and 18 rebounds. In the semifinal game against Japan she had a noble another double double with 19 points and 11 rebounds in a game that went to double overtime, with USA winning 102–98. In the gold-medal game against Canada the team had only a three-point lead starting the fourth quarter but score 34 points in the final quarter to win the gold-medal for the event.

Stanford University Career

Freshman Year

Sophomore Year

Stanford University Statistics
Source

WNBA 
McCall was selected as the fifth pick of the second round (17th overall) of the 2017 WNBA draft by the Indiana Fever. On April 22, 2020, McCall was released by the Fever. On July 12, 2020, McCall signed with the Atlanta Dream. She was released from the Dream on July 29, 2020 to clear a roster spot for Glory Johnson, who was cleared to play after previously testing positive for the coronavirus  One day later, McCall signed with the Minnesota Lynx to replace the injured Karima Christmas-Kelly. On February 5, 2021, McCall was traded to the Washington Mystics for a 2022 third-round draft pick.

WNBA career statistics

Regular season

|-
| align="left" | 2017
| align="left" | Indiana
| 30 || 1 || 10.7 || .406 || .333 || .682 || 2.3 || 0.2 || 0.1 || 0.3 || 0.7 || 3.3
|-
| align="left" | 2018
| align="left" | Indiana
| 34 || 2 || 12.3 || .385 || .125 || .684 || 2.7 || 0.4 || 0.4 || 0.5 || 0.4 || 2.9
|-
| align="left" | 2019
| align="left" | Indiana
| 15 || 0 || 6.9 || .136 || .000 || 1.000 || 1.8 || 0.4 || 0.1 || 0.4 || 0.2 || 0.9
|-
| align="left" | 2020
| align="left" | Atlanta
| 1 || 0 || 0.0 || .000 || .000 || .000 || 2.0 || 0.0 || 1.0 || 0.0 || 0.0 || 0.0
|-
| align="left" | 2020
| align="left" | Minnesota
| 19 || 0 || 9.4 || .356 || .250 || .818 || 2.5 || 0.2 || 0.3 || 0.4 || 0.5 || 2.7
|-
| align="left" | 2021
| align="left" | Washington
| 23 || 6 || 15.5 || .500 || .000 || .625 || 4.3 || 0.6 || 0.3 || 0.4 || 0.9 || 4.1
|-
| align="left" | Career
| align="left" | 5 years, 4 teams
| 122 || 9 || 11.3 || .396 || .188 || .718 || 2.8 || 0.3 || 0.3 || 0.4 || 0.5 || 2.9

Playoffs

|-
| align="left" | 2020
| align="left" | Minnesota
| 3 || 0 || 5.3 || .667 || .000 || 1.000 || 2.0 || 0.0 || 0.0 || 0.3 || 0.0 || 2.3
|-
| align="left" | Career
| align="left" | 1 year, 1 team
| 3 || 0 || 5.3 || .667 || .000 || 1.000 || 2.0 || 0.0 || 0.0 || 0.3 || 0.0 || 2.3

References

1995 births
Living people
American women's basketball players
Atlanta Dream players
Basketball players from Bakersfield, California
Forwards (basketball)
Indiana Fever draft picks
Indiana Fever players
McDonald's High School All-Americans
Medalists at the 2015 Summer Universiade
Minnesota Lynx players
Parade High School All-Americans (girls' basketball)
Stanford Cardinal women's basketball players
Universiade gold medalists for the United States
Universiade medalists in basketball
Washington Mystics players